Jim Vaughan  (born 1868) was a Welsh international footballer. He was part of the Wales national football team between 1893 and 1899, playing 4 matches. He played his first match on 13 March 1893 against England and his last match on 20 March 1899 against England. At club level, he played for Druids.

See also
 List of Wales international footballers (alphabetical)

References

1868 births
Welsh footballers
Wales international footballers
Druids F.C. players
Place of birth missing
Year of death missing
Association footballers not categorized by position